The 2013 Dunlop Series was an Australian motor racing competition for V8 Supercars. It was the fourteenth running of a V8 Supercar Development Series, with all rounds held in support of 2013 International V8 Supercars Championship events.

The introduction of the "New Generation V8 Supercar" regulations to the V8 Supercar Championship resulted in a number of rule changes which affected the Dunlop Series. Teams were only allowed to compete with one model of the cars raced in V8 Supercars. All teams competing with Fords upgraded to the FG Falcon, whilst the Holden teams continued to use the VE Commodore. With all V8 Supercar teams building brand-new chassis for the 2013 season to comply with the New Generation V8 Supercar regulations, many of the cars they used in the 2012 Supercars Championship were sold to Dunlop Series teams.

Dale Wood won the 2013 series driving a Ford FG Falcon for MW Motorsport.

Teams and drivers

The following teams and drivers competed in the 2013 Dunlop Series:

Team changes
 V8 Supercar teams Ford Performance Racing and Walkinshaw Racing will no longer support entries in the Dunlop Series.
 Formula Ford team Evans Motorsport Group purchased a Ford Performance Racing-built Ford FG Falcon that was run by  Rod Nash Racing in the 2012 V8 Supercars Championship. The team later merged with Greg Murphy Racing to run two cars in the 2013 series. The combined team will be campaign with a Triple Eight-built Holden VE Commodore alongside their FPR-built Ford FG Falcon.
 Image Racing purchased the Stone Brothers Racing Ford FG Falcon driven by Shane van Gisbergen in the 2012 V8 Supercars Championship.
 MW Motorsport purchased the Ford FG Falcons used by Ford Performance Racing's Mark Winterbottom and Will Davison in the 2012 V8 Supercars Championship, expanding the team to three cars. Morgan Haber will be the driver of one of the entries.
 Family-owned team Novocastrian Motorsport have purchased two Stone Brothers Racing-built Ford FG Falcons.
 Queensland businessman Maurice Pickering will establish Finance EZI Racing, running two Ford FG Falcons.
 Tony D'Alberto Racing will expand its operations to include a Dunlop Series entry. Using the FG Falcon that D'Alberto used in the 2011 and 2012 V8 Supercar Championships.

Driver changes
 Chris Alajajian will return to the series with Nandi Kiss Racing after a two-year break from competition. Alajajian had previously contested the Development Series in 2007.
 Taz Douglas will return to the Dunlop Series after a year racing for Lucas Dumbrell Motorsport in the International V8 Supercars Championship.
 Andre Heimgartner will move from the Australian Carrera Cup Championship to the Dunlop Series, driving for Finance EZI Racing.
 Reigning third-tier V8 Supercar champion Josh Hunter will join the series, driving for Finance EZI Racing.
 Kristian Lindbom will move from Lucas Dumbrell Motorsport to the combined Evans-Murphy team.
 George Miedecke will move from Sonic Motor Racing Services to Matt Stone Racing.
 Nick McBride, who contested the 2011 British Formula Ford Championship and 2012 British Formula Three Championship will return to Australia to contest the Dunlop Series, driving for Tony D'Alberto Racing.
 Chaz Mostert will move from Ford Performance Racing's Dunlop Series team to MW Motorsport.
 Nick Percat will leave the Dunlop Series to compete in the Australian Carrera Cup Championship.
 Chris Pither will leave the V8 Ute Racing Series and return to the Dunlop Series with Brad Jones Racing. Pither previously competed in the series in 2006 and 2007.
 Jim Pollicina will run a Holden VE Commodore purchased from Greg Murphy Racing and last raced by Dale Wood in the 2012 series at Barbagallo Raceway.
 Two-time MotoGP World Champion Casey Stoner will contest the full series schedule, driving a Holden VE Commodore prepared by Triple Eight Race Engineering.
 Jay Verdnik will return to the category after a three-year hiatus, driving for Eggleston Motorsport.
 Cameron Waters will leave Dreamtime Racing, moving to Minda Motorsport, the team that prepared his entry for the 2011 and 2012 Bathurst 1000 races.
 Sam Walter will return to the Dunlop Series after a three-year absence, racing for Minda Motorsport.
 Dale Wood will move from Greg Murphy Racing to MW Motorsport.

Calendar
The 2013 Dunlop Series comprised nineteen races within seven rounds at seven circuits, all in support of the International V8 Supercars Championship. The calendar remains unchanged from the 2012 season, with only the Winton event being brought forward, reflecting the change in the V8 Supercar Championship calendar.

Points system
Points were awarded to the driver of a car that had completed 75% of the race distance and was running at the completion of the final lap. Two different points scales were applied to rounds having two or three races to ensure that a driver would be awarded 300 points for winning all races at any event.

Points were awarded using the following system:

Series standings

See also
2013 V8 Supercar season

References

Supercars Development Series
Dunlop V8 Supercar Series